Pasquale De Sarlo (born 6 May 1999) is an Italian professional footballer who plays as a forward for  club Imolese.

Club career
Born in Battipaglia, De Sarlo started his career in Avellino and Salernitana youth sector.

In 2019, he joined to Serie C club Rieti for the 2019–20 season. De Sarlo made his professional debut on 24 August 2019 against Ternana.

For the next season, on 21 August 2020 he moved to Casertana.

On 13 August 2021, he signed with Imolese.

Personal life
His father Antonio is the president of Imolese Calcio 1919 since July 2014. De Sarlo graduated in Business Administration.

References

External links
 
 

1999 births
Living people
People from Battipaglia
Footballers from Campania
Italian footballers
Association football forwards
Serie C players
U.S. Avellino 1912 players
U.S. Salernitana 1919 players
F.C. Rieti players
Casertana F.C. players
Imolese Calcio 1919 players
Sportspeople from the Province of Salerno